Aaglacrinus is an extinct genus of crinoidea in the Cladia order. It has been proposed that it was a stationary (attached) suspension feeder the hard parts of which were composed of magnesium calcite.

Species
There are currently two species in this genus, both of which are under the name Aaglaocrinus:

 Aaglaocrinus bowsheri (Webster & Kues, 2006)
 Aaglaocrinus sphaeri (Strimple 1949)

References

External links
Find articles
Geo Info
CLADID CRINOID (ECHINODERMATA) ANAL CONDITIONS: A TERMINOLOGY PROBLEM AND PROPOSED SOLUTION

Carboniferous crinoids
Fossils of the United States